is a 2017 Japanese romantic comedy film. The second co-project of director Junichi Ishikawa and screenwriter Ryota Kosawa after the 2015 film April Fools, it stars Yui Aragaki and Eita. It was released October 21, 2017.

Plot
Tomita Tamako is a child table tennis prodigy. She has been undergoing vigorous table tennis training by her mom. But after her mom died, she quit the sport and never played again. She fell in love with her company's male table tennis player Ejima Akihiko. But Akihiko cheated on her when the company recruited a new female table tennis player, Airi Ogasawara, and they broke up. Dejected, she quit her job and returned to her hometown.

She then discovered that her father, a taxi driver, is deeply in debt. He asked her to help him out. She initially worked in a canned food factory but was soon fired for her clumsiness. Left with no other option, she took over the family's rundown table tennis club which only has five members. Meanwhile, Hagiwara Hisashi, a divorced former boxer, is working in construction nearby and he decided to take up table tennis and joined the club, because his daughter has taken up the sport.

In order to gain fame and recruit more members, Tamako decided to enter the national tournament. Tamako chose to enter Mixed Doubles as it is easier to win than singles. As the other members have found their partners Tamako is reluctantly paired with Hagi.

All 3 pairs suffered huge defeats in the regional tournament, but they vowed to continue training in order to play again one year later. They recruited the Chinese restaurant owners, who were China national table tennis team rejects, to help with their training. After months of intense training, Tamako and Hagi finally defeat the Chinese restaurant pair and are ready for the regional tournament.

Hagi's ex-wife and daughter turned up at the table tennis club and said they would like him to return and has found him a job. But the job interview is on the same date of the tournament. Realizing this is a chance for Hagi to re-establish his relationship with his family, Tamako decided not to join the tournament and went back to work in the canned food factory.

The other pairs, despite better performances, suffered defeats in the first rounds. Hagi sought out Tamako in the canned food factory, he told her his ex-wife and daughter already established new lives with another man and declared his love for her. The pair arrived at the tournament in time for their match. They advanced to the final and face Tamako's former boyfriend Ejima Akihiko and Airi Ogasawara. The match lasted until the last set when Ejima Akihiko won the match by a lucky reflex save.

Despite the loss, Tamako and Hagi found fame and the table tennis club turned into a hugely popular club.

Cast
 Yui Aragaki plays , an ex-child table tennis prodigy, who grew up to despise the sport.
 Eita plays , nicknamed , a former championship boxer who tries to play table tennis to cope his failure.
 Ryōko Hirosue plays , Tamako's best friend.
 Hayato Sano plays , a high school student that plays table tennis to avoid school.
 Kenichi Endō plays , a farmer who plays table tennis as a hobby.
 Misako Tanaka plays , Motonobu's wife and also plays table tennis as a hobby.
 Hiroyuki Morisaki plays , a Sichuanese cook who was expelled from the prestigious Chinese table tennis team. 
Yū Aoi plays , a Sichuanese worker who was expelled from the prestigious Chinese table tennis team along with Cho. 
 Yōko Maki plays , Tamako's deceased mother and table tennis coach.
 Fumiyo Kohinata plays , Tamako's father and a Taxi driver.
 Koji Seto plays , Tamako's ex-boyfriend.
 Mei Nagano plays , Akihiko's girlfriend.

Cameo roles
 Kasumi Ishikawa as herself
 Jun Mizutani as himself

Production

Development
Filming began mid-February, 2017 and finished late March 2017.

Music
Shishamo sang the theme song of the film (ほら、笑ってる,。Hora, waratteru.)

Reception

Awards

References

External links
 

2017 films
Table tennis films
Japanese romantic comedy films
Toho films
2010s Japanese films